is a 2007 Japanese film based on a novel by Yoshinaga Fujita.

Synopsis
Leading a lazy life, Fumiya has been a student for 8 years and owes money to loan sharks. One day, a man named Fukuhara comes to collect the loan, which Fumiya cannot pay. Fukuhara makes a proposition: he will cancel the debt as long as Fumiya agrees to take walks through Tokyo, eventually ending up at the police station in Kasumigaseki, where he intends to turn himself in for a crime he deeply regrets. Not having much choice, Fumiya accepts the deal.

The film is based on the original novel by the 125th Naoki Prize winner Yoshinaga Fujita.

Cast
 Joe Odagiri as Fumiya Takemura
 Tomokazu Miura as Aiichiro Fukuhara
 Kyōko Koizumi as Makiko
 Yuriko Yoshitaka as Fufumi

Festivals
 Udine Far East Festival 2008
 New York Asian Film Festival 2008
 Neuchâtel International Fantasy Film Festival 2008
 Fantasia Festival 2008
 Raindance Film Festival 2008
 Toronto Reel Asian International Film Festival 2008 – Closing Film
 Ottawa International Film Festival

Awards
 Fantasia International Film Festival: Best Script (Satoshi Miki); Special Mention (Jo Odagiri and Tomokazu Miura)
 Kinema Junpo Awards: Best Supporting Actor (Tomokazu Miura)

International Release
 Japan : November 10, 2007
 Canada :  Montreal : April 10, 2009 – (DÉRIVE À TOKYO) Toronto : May 1, 2009 & Vancouver : May 22, 2009

References

External links
 
 eFilmCritic
 Twitchfilm
 Variety

2007 films
2007 comedy-drama films
2000s road comedy-drama films
Films set in Tokyo
Films shot in Tokyo
2000s Japanese-language films
Films based on Japanese novels
Japanese comedy-drama films
Japanese road movies
2000s Japanese films